Begunkodor is a census town in the Jhalda II CD block in the Jhalda subdivision of the Purulia district of West Bengal near its border with Jharkhand, situated 46 km away from district town Purulia. Jhalda is the sub division headquarter of the census town which is 8 km away.

Geography

Location

Area overview
Purulia district forms the lowest step of the Chota Nagpur Plateau. The general scenario is undulating land with scattered hills. Jhalda subdivision, shown in the map alongside, is located in the western part of the district, bordering Jharkhand. The Subarnarekha flows along a short stretch of its western border. It is an overwhelmingly rural subdivision with 91.02% of the population living in the rural areas and 8.98% living in the urban areas. There are 3 census towns in the subdivision. The map alongside shows some of the tourist attractions in the Ajodhya Hills. The area is home to Purulia Chhau dance with spectacular masks made at Charida. The remnants of old temples and deities are found in the subdivision also, as in other parts of the district.

Note: The map alongside presents some of the notable locations in the subdivision. All places marked in the map are linked in the larger full screen map.

Weather
yearly average rainfall of the census town is 150 mm. Maximum temperature here reaches up to 40℃ in summer where as it falls up to 5℃ in winter.

Demographics
The Begunkodor census town has a population of 6347 of which 3242 are males while 3105 are females as per report released by census India 2011. Female sex ratio is of 958 against state average of 950. In Begunkodor, male literacy rate is around 66.21% while female literary rate is 44.99%.

Religion
Hindus constitute 98% of the total population and are the largest religious community in the census town followed by Muslims who constitute 2% of the total population.

Infrastructure
According to the District Census Handbook 2011, Puruliya, Begunkodor covered an area of 3.2276 km2. There is a railway station at Jhalda 8 km away. Among the civic amenities, it had 3 km roads with both open and covered drains, the protected water supply involved overhead tank, uncovered well, hand pump. It had 950 domestic electric connections and 44 road light points. Among the medical facilities it had 3 dispensaries/ health centres, 8 medicine shops. Among the educational facilities it had were 9 primary schools, 1 middle school, 1 secondary school, 1 senior secondary school, the nearest degree college at Jhalda. It had 2 old age homes. Among the social, recreational and cultural facilities it had 1 auditorium/ community hall, 1 public library. Three important commodities it produced were vegetables, paddy and mustard. It has branches of 1 nationalised bank, 1 private commercial bank, 1 cooperative bank, 1 agricultural credit society and 2 non-agricultural credit society.

Tourism
Begunkodor has its own scenic beauty around it. Situated at the river bank of Saharjore river it is surrounded by Ayodhya hill range and is only 3.5 km away from Murguma dam, which itself is a popular picnic destination & best sunset place. The Historic Thakurbari and Rashmela in Begunkodor is preserved by Archeological department of West Bengal and visited by thousands of tourists every year. The haunted railway station of Begunkodar is also popular as "ghost station".

Transportation
Begunkodor is well connected with the District Town Purulia and subdivision town Jhalda through roads. Around 30 buses regularly run between Begunkodor to Purulia and vice versa. Nearest Railway station is Begunkodor railway station and nearest town Jhalda, which is 8 km away, is well connected through buses and autos. Regular Night service Bus service is also available between Begunkodor to Kolkata, which is 350 km away from the town.

Railway Station

History 
Begunkodor got its station due to the joint efforts of the queen of Santals (the original inhabitants of the villages nearby) and Indian Railways in the year 1960.

The story of the railway station
However, the ill-fated station ran into unforeseen troubles just 7 years later. According to the villagers, in 1967, a railway employee reported the sighting of a woman's ghost, and it was rumored that she had died in a railway accident. The next day he told people about it and they ignored him. The real trouble started when the dead bodies of the station master and his family were found in their quarters. The station was subsequently closed as railway trains stopped making halts here.

West Bengal's 'haunted' Begun kodar railway station story

Reopening in 2009
Basudeb Acharia said that railway employees had made up the story to avoid being posted there. In the late 1990s the villagers formed a committee and asked the officials to reopen the station. About a decade later, in August 2009, the railway station was finally reopened as a passenger train halt, by former Railway minister Mamata Banerjee. However, regularly 10 trains halt here, with the last train being on 10.30pm. However, passengers still avoid using the station after sunset. Many ghost hunters have visited the station repeatedly confirming that there is no presence of ghosts.

In December 2017, a group of nine rationalists spent a night at the station, and found no evidence of any ghosts or spirits.

References

Cities and towns in Purulia district